I've Visited the Island of Jocks and Jazz is the second album by The Hospitals, and was released in 2005.

Track listing
All songs by Adam Stonehouse.

Side one
"Bands" 		
"Rich People" 		
"Olympic Ghost" 		
"She's Not There" 
"Moving/Shaking" 
"Jocks and Jazz" 
Side two		
"I Had a Crummy Shift" 		
"Problems" 		
"Airplanes There" 		
"Art Project" 		
"Be" 		
"Boom Bap Biff"
"Thank You (Floors)"

Personnel
Adam Stonehouse – vocals, drums
John Dwyer – guitar
Ned Meiners – guitar

References

2005 albums
The Hospitals albums